The 1975–76 New York Knicks season was the 30th season for the team in the National Basketball Association (NBA). In the regular season, the Knicks had a 38–44 win–loss record, finishing in fourth place in the Atlantic Division and failing to qualify for the 1976 NBA Playoffs. Earl Monroe was the leading scorer for the Knicks with 20.7 points per game. Spencer Haywood led New York in rebounding with 11.3 per game, and Walt Frazier averaged a team-best 5.9 assists per game.

In the 1975 NBA Draft, the Knicks had the ninth overall pick and used it to select Gene Short. New York reached an agreement with American Basketball Association forward George McGinnis for a six-year contract, but it was rejected by the NBA because the Philadelphia 76ers held his rights after choosing him in the 1973 NBA Draft. The Knicks were stripped of their first-round pick in the 1976 draft for attempting to sign McGinnis. Attempts to sign retired center Wilt Chamberlain were also unsuccessful.

Early in the season, the Knicks lost five consecutive games in November 1975, and by mid-December they had lost 20 of their first 30 games. At this time the Knicks went on a six-game winning streak, and in January 1976 they had another unbeaten run of six games that left their record at 24–23. This was the only point during the season when New York had a winning percentage above .500; they immediately lost five games in a row and remained under .500 for the rest of the season. A March 30 loss to the Phoenix Suns officially eliminated the Knicks from postseason contention; it was the first season since 1965–66 that the team did not reach the playoffs.

Roster

Regular season

Season standings

z – clinched division title
y – clinched division title
x – clinched playoff spot

Record vs. opponents

References

New York Knicks seasons
New York
New York Knicks
New York Knicks
1970s in Manhattan
Madison Square Garden